Serial imagery is the repeating of one image in many variations or forms. It is a central idea in modern and contemporary art. It can take several forms. A portrait can painted in differing hues and backgrounds with subtle changes to the subject as in Van Gogh's L'Arlésienne and Claude Monet's Rouen Cathedral. Another type is where the same subject is painted at different times of day or seasons of the year for example Claude Monet in his Poplars, Haystacks. The same subject may also be rendered in different mediums, and in different poses, thus, the practice of underpainting may be considered a form of serial imagery even if the image is lost in the completed work. It is common in photography where multiple exposures at varies angles are taken with different lenses etc. in search of the desired effect. It is also used in literature, especially poetry.

	Some say the Impressionists and their contemporaries were the first to use it, but this is not the case. It was used by Francisco Goya with his La maja desnuda and La maja vestida (1797-1800). It is seen in classical art whenever studies were made and used to produce a finished work. This was a common practice for Leonardo da Vinci, Michelangelo and most of the other classical artists although most of their studies and sketches did not survive.

	Here is an example from literature:
    What Say You? 
   (By Eric Ericson)
 
 What say you faithful tree?
 In summer's glory standing tall 
 while autumn's minions sneak 
 to steal your green,
 so you go necked into winter.
 
 What say you faithful tree? 
 In golden robes resplendent, 
 your arm's reach skyward 
 showing off your finery,
 knowing this to shall pass. 
 
 What say you faithful tree
 standing necked in the snow?
 I would pity you,
 as winter's icy breath bites
 your fingers and tears your flesh,
 but you don't want me to.
 
 What say you faithful tree?
 As the sun turns warm
 all clad in white blossoms
 with velvet leaves
 just beginning to show.
 What say you?

(copyright by author. used with permission, This poem may be copied if authorship is included and used for educational purposes only)

John Coplans supplied a critical approach in an exhibition at the Pasadena Art Museum in 1968.

Literature
•	John Coplans: Serial Imagery, exh. cat. Pasadena Art Museum 1968, New York Graphic Society, 1968
•	Eric Ericson: “To Everything a Season”, What Say You? page 33 published 2010

Visual arts media
Visual arts genres